Shane's Castle is a ruined castle near Randalstown in County Antrim, Northern Ireland, having been destroyed by fire in 1816. The castle is on the north-east shores of Lough Neagh. Built in 1345 by a member of the Clandeboy O'Neill dynasty, it was originally known as Edenduffcarrick, meaning "brow of black rock" (from the Irish éadán dúcharraige). It owes its present name to Shane McBrian McPhelim O'Neill, who ruled Lower Clandeboy between 1595 and 1617.

History

Shanes' castle was originally built in 1345. A fire in 1816 left the castle in ruins though the family papers were saved.

In popular culture
The castle's 1816 destruction by fire was the subject of John Neal's poem "Castle Shane," published in The Portico the same year. The ruins have been used in the HBO TV series Game of Thrones.

Shane Castle Railway

The Shane Castle Railway was the brainchild of Raymond O'Neill, 4th Baron O'Neill, a railway enthusiast, who featured the line as a star experience when opening the Castle as a tourist attraction from 1971 until 1995.

The railway was of 3 ft 0in gauge and in 1982 included the following:

See also
 Earl O'Neill
 Baron O'Neill

References

External links
 https://web.archive.org/web/20100309084823/http://www.discovernorthernireland.com/Shanes-Castle-Antrim-P3047
 http://www.libraryireland.com/Atlas/Shanes-Castle.php
 

Castles in County Antrim
Ruined castles in Northern Ireland
Grade A listed buildings
Listed ruins in Northern Ireland
Clandeboye